The following lists events that happened in 1953 in Libya.

Incumbents
Monarch: Idris 
Prime Minister: Mahmud al-Muntasir

Sports
3 August - Libya national football team played its first official international match.

References

 
Years of the 20th century in Libya
Libya
Libya
1950s in Libya